Haunt the House: Terrortown is a side-scrolling action puzzle video game developed by SFB Games. The game was released for PlayStation Vita on 9 January 2013, for Microsoft Windows and OS X on 6 June 2014, and for Android and iOS on 30 October 2014.

Gameplay 
The game starts in an abandoned town where a ghost lives until people start to move into the town, disturbing its sleep. It attempts to scare everyone out of the town to rest in peace once again. The player can move the ghost around a building and possess objects to scare people. The more people it scares, the more paranormal powers it will gain. The goal of the game is to scare everyone out of a building; however, if a person is scared too much, they may commit suicide by throwing themselves out of a window. Once a building is empty, the player moves on to the next building. After everyone is scared out of town, the ghost is shown to be in a painting of what appears to be its family.

By scaring people, the player can raise the room's "atmosphere" which unlocks new actions for possessed objects. Some actions can be used to kill certain characters that can't be scared, and they will become a ghost that travels back to the clock tower. They will also appear in the painting at the tower.

Reception 

Haunt the House: Terrortown received "mixed or average" reviews, according to review aggregator Metacritic, on which the PlayStation Vita and iOS versions both hold an aggregated review score of 73/100, based on four reviews each. Representatively for Eurogamer, Christian Donlan gave the game a score of 8/10, saying "Emotional cruelty, suicide, haunted euphoniums—there's a surprisingly dark heart beating away inside this cheery little Halloween special. There's a genuine sense of mischief, too, conveyed by the bug-eyed howls of your prey and the looping, lilting tones of the jazz-club soundtrack."

References

External links 
 

2013 video games
Android (operating system) games
IOS games
MacOS games
PlayStation Vita games
Puzzle video games
Indie video games
Single-player video games
Video games developed in the United Kingdom
Windows games